Lyla is an album by jazz bassist Avishai Cohen, released in 2003.

Track listing

References

External links
Avishai Cohen's website

2003 albums
Sunnyside Records albums